The 1906 Eifion by-election was held on 5 June 1906.  The by-election was held due to the resignation of the incumbent Liberal MP, John Bryn Roberts to become a county court judge. It was won by the Liberal candidate Ellis William Davies.

Roberts' decision to resign in 1906 and accept the offer of the county court judgeship has been seen by some as an escape from the coming radical Liberal politics with which he found little favour.

References

1906 elections in the United Kingdom
1906 in Wales
1900s elections in Wales
By-elections to the Parliament of the United Kingdom in Welsh constituencies
Politics of Caernarfonshire
Unopposed by-elections to the Parliament of the United Kingdom (need citation)